Jan Šulc (191630 May 2001) was a Czechoslovak slalom canoeist who competed in the 1940s and the 1950s. He won four medals at the ICF Canoe Slalom World Championships with a gold (C-1 team: 1953) and three silvers (C-2: 1953; C-2 team: 1949, 1951).

References
 

1916 births
2001 deaths
Czechoslovak male canoeists
Medalists at the ICF Canoe Slalom World Championships
Czech male canoeists